Andrew John Hilbert (born February 6, 1981) is an American former professional ice hockey forward who played in the National Hockey League with the Boston Bruins, Chicago Blackhawks, Pittsburgh Penguins, New York Islanders and the Minnesota Wild.

Playing career 

As a youth, Hilbert played in the 1995 Quebec International Pee-Wee Hockey Tournament with the Detroit Little Caesars minor ice hockey team.

Hilbert was drafted by the Boston Bruins in the 2nd round (37th overall) in the 2000 NHL Entry Draft from the University of Michigan of the Central Collegiate Hockey Association. In his sophomore year, Hilber was named an AHCA West First-Team All-American and All-CCHA First Team. On July 9, 2001, Hilbert chose to conclude his collegiate career and turn professional. In his rookie season with the Boston Bruins American Hockey League affiliate, the Providence Bruins, Hilbert was named to the AHL All-Rookie Team and AHL All-Star Classic.

Hilbert missed the beginning of the 2003–04 season due to a groin injury. This kept him to a total of 19 AHL games.

On February 9, 2005, Hilbert was named to the AHL All-Star Classic as a replacement for Thomas Vanek.

In November 2005, Hilbert was traded by the Bruins to the Chicago Blackhawks for a 5th round selection in the 2006 NHL Entry Draft. In the same season he was claimed off waivers by the Pittsburgh Penguins on March 9, 2006.

On July 4, 2006, Hilbert was signed as a free agent to a one-year contract with the New York Islanders. Hilbert produced a career high 28 points in his first full season in the NHL with the Islanders in 2006-07, and was subsequently rewarded with a two-year contract extension on July 3, 2007.

As a free agent, Hilbert was belatedly signed prior to the 2009-10 season to a one-year contract with the Minnesota Wild on October 1, 2009.

He returned to the Islanders organization the following year on August 18, 2010. However, due to injury was forced to retire.

Career statistics

Regular season and playoffs

International

Awards and honors

References

External links 

1981 births
Living people
American men's ice hockey centers
Boston Bruins draft picks
Boston Bruins players
Chicago Blackhawks players
Houston Aeros (1994–2013) players
Ice hockey players from Michigan
Michigan Wolverines men's ice hockey players
Minnesota Wild players
New York Islanders players
Norfolk Admirals players
People from Howell, Michigan
Pittsburgh Penguins players
Providence Bruins players
Sportspeople from Metro Detroit
USA Hockey National Team Development Program players
AHCA Division I men's ice hockey All-Americans